The Sumatran montane rain forests ecoregion (WWF ID: IM0159) covers the mountainous elevations (greater than 1,000 meters) of the Barisan Mountains Range that runs the length of the southwestern side of the island of Sumatra in Indonesia.  The ecoregion is almost completely surrounded by the lower elevation Sumatran lowland rain forests.  The area is one of very high biodiversity - because of the relative isolation, and variety of forest types, there are 7 endemic species of mammals and eight endemic species of birds.

Location and description 
The Barisan Mountains stretch for 1,600 km along the southwest side of Sumatra, the product of the subducting Australia Plate and the overriding Sunda Plate. There are 35 active volcanoes in the region, with the western side steeper, and the eastern slide inclining to lowlands and plains.

Climate 
The climate of the ecoregion is Tropical rainforest climate (Köppen climate classification (Af)).  This climate is characterized as hot, humid, and having at least 60 mm of precipitation every month.  Annual precipitation in the mountains averages 2,500 mm.  The eastern side of the Barisan Mountains are in a rain shadow, and receive less precipitation than the west side.

Flora and fauna 
75% of the ecoregion is covered with closed, broadleaf evergreen forest, another 15% in other types of closed forest, and 7% open forest.  There are three main forest types in the ecoregion, based on elevation: the 'lower montane forest', 'upper montane forest', and 'sub-alpine forest'.

The lower montane forest has tree species similar to the lowland rain forests, but they are shorter (up to 35 meters), buttresses are rare, llianas (woody vines) are rare, epiphytes become more common, and the lowland domination of trees of the family Dipterocarpaceae gives way to more trees of the oak family Fagaceae, such as stone oaks (Lithocarpus), and of the laurel family Lauraceae, such as Cinnamomum burmannii.

The upper montane forest forms at higher elevations, depending on temperature and cloud level.  The trees in this zone are shorter (up to 20 meters, and epiphytes, such as moss and lichens, are  more common.  The sub-alpine forest zone begins at higher elevations, and features grasses, heath, and bogs.  Trees in the sub-alpine zone are scattered and stunted, typically under 10 meters in height.

Mammals of conservation interest include the vulnerable Thomas's langur (Presbytis thomasi), the vulnerable Sumatran striped rabbit (Nesolagus netscheri), and the Sumatran tiger (Panthera tigris).

Protected areas 
Over 31% of the ecoregion is officially protected. The protected areas include:
 Mount Leuser National Park
 Bukit Barisan Selatan National Park
 Kerinci Seblat National Park
 Batang Gadis National Park

References 

Indomalayan ecoregions
Ecoregions of Indonesia
Tropical and subtropical moist broadleaf forests
Montane forests
Geography of Sumatra
Flora of Sumatra
Ecoregions of Malesia